The 2022 Mountain Pacific Sports Federation Volleyball Tournament was a postseason men's volleyball tournament for the Mountain Pacific Sports Federation during the 2022 NCAA Division I & II men's volleyball season. It was held April 20 through April 23, 2022 at the #1 seed's home arena, Pauley Pavilion on the campus of UCLA. All games were streamed live on FloVolleyball.

The winner received The Federation's automatic bid to the 2022 NCAA Volleyball Tournament, to be held at Pauley Pavilion.

Seeds
All seven teams are eligible for the postseason, with the #1 seed receiving a bye to the semifinals. Teams are seeded by record within the conference, with a tiebreaker system to seed teams with identical conference records. The #1 seed will play the lowest remaining seed in the semifinals.

Should a team be unable to play a match due to COVID-19, it will count as a loss in the conference standings, and it will be used to determine MPSF Tournament seeding.

Schedule and results

Bracket

Game summaries
All times are Pacific.

Quarterfinals

Semifinals

MPSF Championship

All-Tournament Team

 Bryce Dvorak (MVP), Pepperdine 
 Jacob Steele, Pepperdine 
 Alex Gettinger, Pepperdine 
 Justin Lui, Stanford 
 Will Rottman, Stanford 
 Sam Kobrine, USC 
 Kevin Kobrine, UCLA

References

2022 Mountain Pacific Sports Federation volleyball season
Mountain Pacific Sports Federation Volleyball Tournament
2022 NCAA Division I & II men's volleyball season